Tonner Doll Company, Inc. was a collectible doll design and distribution company located in Kingston, New York. Founded by Robert Tonner in 1991, Tonner Doll designed and marketed original doll lines as well as a number of licensed dolls for films such as Harry Potter, Spider-Man 3, and Twilight. Its original products included the Tyler Wentworth, Kitty Collier and Antoinette series.

History
Tonner Doll Company, Inc. was founded in 1991 by Robert Tonner under the name Robert Tonner Doll Designs (RTDD). Originally, the company had only three employees: Tonner, his partner Harris Safier, and a part-time seamstress. In February 1991, RTDD made its public debut at the American International Toy Fair in New York City. Multi-jointed porcelain fashion dolls and jointed porcelain child dolls were displayed at the fair in limited editions ranging in price from $650 to $1500.

Through the marketing of Safier, along with newly hired publicist Rebecca Plasker, and Robert Tonner's overall quality of designs, RTDD saw exponential growth in its first year. By the end of 1992, RTDD was well on its way to becoming a prosperous enterprise. However, the massive demand would be overwhelming for the very small RTDD and only a fraction of the original orders would be filled.

In 1995, Tonner Doll gained licensing rights for the recreation of the 1950s paper doll Betsy McCall for reintroduction to the collectors market. To keep the cost down, Tonner decided to produce the doll in China. Made from vinyl, the Betsy McCall license was one of the initial mainstream commercial successes of the company.

Over the following years, RTDD began to grow the size of its staff to accommodate the rising demand. This growth would lead the company to be renamed the Tonner Doll Company. By the year 2000, Tonner Doll employed 24 people including designers, marketers, and various sales and administrative staff.

In 2017, the company released the first ever transgender doll, modeled after the American activist and transgender teen Jazz Jennings.

In December 2018, the Tonner Doll company officially closed.

Licensing rights
Tonner Doll had the licensing rights to design and develop dolls based on many American television, cinema, comic book, and video game franchises.

Since the 1995 issue of the Betsy McCall doll, Tonner Doll had gained the rights to movies such as 1997's Titanic (Kate Winslet), and  1999's Star Wars: Episode I – The Phantom Menace (Natalie Portman). In 2006, Tonner Doll gained licensing rights to recreate the cast of the Harry Potter series, as well as Memoirs of a Geisha.

Tonner Doll licensed comic book heroes and villains from DC Comics for their DC STARS Collection. The line included 13, 17, and 22 inch dolls, including various versions of Aquaman, Batgirl, Batman, Black Canary, Catwoman, Donna Troy, Dove, Green Lantern, Harley Quinn, Hawkwoman, Huntress, Joker, Lois Lane, Mera, Poison Ivy, Power Girl, Raven, Starfire, Supergirl (Linda Danvers), Superman, Wonder Woman (Diana Prince), and Zatanna.

In the company's history, Tonner Doll also licensed the Twilight Saga, Lara Croft, Tomb Raider: Legend, Chicago, Dreamgirls, The Chronicles of Narnia, The Golden Compass, Mary Engelbreit's Ann Estelle, Fancy Nancy,  Thèâtre de la Mode, Dick Tracy, Get Smart, Disney Princesses, Mary Poppins, Davy Crockett, Pirates of the Caribbean, Ava Gardner, Joan Crawford, Bette Davis, Miss Piggy, Miss America,  and characters from the comic strip, For Better or for Worse by Lynn Johnston. Additional licenses included Tim Burton's Alice in Wonderland, The Lord of the Rings, Disney's Prince of Persia, and Disney Princess Tiana, from The Princess and the Frog, Disney's first African-American Princess.

Effanbee buyout
In 2002 Tonner Doll purchased the Effanbee Doll Company, Inc. to obtain the rights to several classic characters from the company's century-old history. They gained exclusive rights to Bernard Lipfert's 1928 Patsy doll, Patsyette. Effanbee also had the rights to reproduce fashion dolls licensed by Tribune Media like the Brenda Starr, Girl Reporter series, and the comic strip, Little Orphan Annie.

For the first few years after the buyout, Effanbee remained an independent subsidiary of Tonner Doll, however the two eventually became a conglomerate run under a singular management. The Effanbee doll lines are designed, produced, marketed, and distributed by Tonner Doll, while retaining the Effanbee name.

References

Further reading
 Robert Tonner Inspirations: A personal guided tour through the culture that shaped the acclaimed doll designers career and creations, Reverie Publishing Company 2006
 The Robert Tonner Story: Dreams and Dolls, By Stephanie Finnegan. Portfolio Press 2000

External links
New Amazing Tonner Dolls

Doll manufacturing companies
Toy companies of the United States
American companies established in 1991
American companies disestablished in 2018
Toy companies established in 1991
1991 establishments in New York (state)
2018 disestablishments in New York (state)
Kingston, New York
Defunct manufacturing companies based in New York (state)